William Norman Trevor Sansom FRSL (born Norman Trevor Sansom;
18 January 1912 – 20 April 1976) was a British novelist, travel and short story writer known for his highly descriptive prose style.

Profile
Sansom was born in London, the third son of Ernest Brooks Sansom, M.I.N.A., a naval architect, by his wife Mabel (née Clark). He was educated at Uppingham School, Rutland, before moving to Bonn to learn German. Named Norman Trevor Sansom at birth, he was called "William" as a child and used this name throughout his life.

From 1930, Sansom worked in international banking for the British chapter of a German bank, and in 1935 he moved to an advertising company where he worked until the outbreak of World War II. Then he became a full-time London firefighter, serving throughout The Blitz. His experiences during that time inspired much of his writing, including many of the stories in the celebrated collection Fireman Flower. He also appeared in Humphrey Jennings's famous film about the Blitz, Fires Were Started, as the fireman who plays the piano.

After the war, Sansom became a full-time writer. In 1946 and 1947 he was awarded two literary prizes by the Society of Authors, and in 1951 was elected a Fellow of the Royal Society of Literature. In 1954, he married actress Ruth Grundy, daughter of Norman Grundy, FCA. They had two sons, Sean (adopted by Sansom; the son of Ruth Grundy's previous marriage to Grey Wilson Blake) and Nicholas.

As well as exploring war-torn London, Sansom's writing deals with romance (The Face of Innocence), murder ("Various Temptations"), comedy ("A Last Word") and supernatural horror ("A Woman Seldom Found"). The latter, perhaps his most anthologized story, combines detailed description with narrative tension to unravel a young man's encounter with a bizarre creature in Rome.

Sansom died suddenly at St Mary's Hospital, London, from a serious illness.

Selected works

Novels
 The Body (1949)
 The Face of Innocence (1951)
 The Last Hours of Sandra Lee (1961)
 The Guilt in Wandering (1963)
 Hans Feet in love (1971)
 Skimpy (1974)
 A Young Wife's Tale (1974)
 The Cautious Heart
 The Loving Eye
 A Bed of Roses
 Goodbye (1966)

Short novels
 Three
 The Equilibriad

Short story collections
 Fireman Flower (1944)
 South (1948)
 Something Terrible, Something Lovely (1948)
 The Passionate North (1950)
 A Touch of the Sun (1952)
 Lord Love Us (1954)
 A Contest of Ladies (1956)
 Among the Dahlias (1957)
 The Stories of William Sansom (1963)
 The Ulcerated Milkman (1966)
 The Marmalade Bird (1973)
 Various Temptations (2002)

Non-fiction
 Westminster at War (1947)
 Pleasures Strange and Simple (1953)
 The Icicle and the Sun (1958)
 Blue Skies, Brown Studies (1961)
 Away to It All (1964)
 A Book of Christmas (1968)
 Grand Tour Today (1968)
 The Birth of a Story (1972)
 Proust and His World (1973)

Children's literature
 It Was Really Charlie's Castle
 The Light that Went Out

As illustrator
 Who's Zoo by Michael Braude (1963) – light verse; humor and satire, ; animals from A to Z in verse,

Citations
In his classical work The Presentation of Self in Everyday Life, Erving Goffman used an extended paragraph of Sansom's A Contest of Ladies to develop his model of the social role and the dramaturgical approach to sociology.

References

External links

 William Sansom FRSL, copyright the William Sansom Estate
 Short story "A Woman Seldom Found"
 
 Biography at eNotes.com
 Supernatural Fiction Database entry
 

1912 births
1976 deaths
English short story writers
English travel writers
English children's writers
Fellows of the Royal Society of Literature
People educated at Uppingham School
Writers from London
20th-century English novelists
20th-century British short story writers
Weird fiction writers
Civil Defence Service personnel